Ovodynerus is an Afrotropical genus of potter wasps which contains eleven species.

Potter wasps are solitary builders of 'flask-shaped' nests of mud, each containing an egg and larval food supply.

Species 
The following species are classified as belonging to the genus Ovodynerus:

 Ovodynerus ashtonensis Gusenleitner, 2005
 Ovodynerus capicola (Meade-Waldo, 1915)
 Ovodynerus chapini (Bequaert, 1918)
 Ovodynerus ferrugineimaculatus Giordani Soika, 1985
 Ovodynerus humeralis Giordani Soika, 1989
 Ovodynerus kabarensis (Bequaert, 1918)
 Ovodynerus leviclypeus Gusenleitner, 1999
 Ovodynerus sjoestedti (Cameron, 1910)
 Ovodynerus tricoloratus Gusenleitner, 2003
 Ovodynerus willowmorensis Giordani Soika, 1985
 Ovodynerus yngvei (Cameron, 1910)

References

Hymenoptera genera
Potter wasps